Kyle Steenland (born November 5, 1946) is an American epidemiologist and professor in the department of environmental health epidemiology at Emory University's Rollins School of Public Health.

Education
Steenland received his BA in history from Stanford University in 1968, his PhD in history from the University at Buffalo in 1974, his PhD in epidemiology from the University of Pennsylvania in 1985, and his MS in mathematics from the University of Cincinnati in 1989.

Career
Prior to joining Emory's Rollins School of Public Health in 2002, Steenland worked at the National Institute for Occupational Safety and Health in Cincinnati for 20 years. As of 2013, he was also training researchers in Chile and Peru.

Research
Steenland is known for his research on various carcinogens, including welding, ethylene oxide, diesel fumes, silica, and dioxin.

References

American epidemiologists
1946 births
Living people
Emory University faculty
National Institute for Occupational Safety and Health
Stanford University alumni
University at Buffalo alumni
Perelman School of Medicine at the University of Pennsylvania alumni
University of Cincinnati alumni